Wood Rat is the 1st combination of the sexagenary cycle of the Chinese zodiac.

Years of the Wood Rat 
The year in which the Western calendar year is divided by 60 and the year with an excess of 4 is the year of the Wood Rat.

Overview 
It was four years after the year of the Metal Rooster, the year of the Revolution of the Dynasty changeover, and was considered the year of the revolutionary decree, or the year of many upheavals, when the Tian will is renewed and heavenly commands are given to those who possess virtue (Kouji kaihatsu '). In order to prevent this, the new year has often been held in this year since the Heian period in Japan. Since the Koshi Reform of 1024, the only year prior to the Meiji era (when the reign of the first emperor was abolished with the decree of Issei Ichigen) in which there was no Koshi Reform was in Eiroku7 (1564).。

Emperor Emperor Kanmu was also the son of Tenchi, who ascended to the throne after the Tenmu lineage was severed by the murder of his half-brother Otomo, a prince of the Tenchi line. Emperor Kōnin, and it is said that he moved the capital to Nagaoka-kyo in 784, the year of the Revolution, because he was strongly aware of the change of royal line.

The Yellow Turban Rebellion, which occurred in 184, the last days of the Later Han Dynasty in China and determined the dissolution of the Han Dynasty, was described as "the " ("Book of the Later Han|The Later Han Dynasty"). Volume 71: Huangfu Song, Zhu Shiyi, Biography 61 Huang Fu Bulk biography)". The slogan was.

A hot spring discovered in Mutsu (now Fukushima Prefecture) in Nanboku-chō period in 1384 was named Koshi Onsen (甲子温泉) in honor of the year Koshi.

Ito Daizo (大藏) changed his name to Ito Koshi-taro (Kashitaro/Kinetaro) in honor of the first year of Genji (1864), the year of the Koshi.

The baseball stadium built in Taisho 13 (1924) in Hyōgo Prefecture Nishinomiya City was named "Koshien Grand Sports Ground" (now Hanshin Koshien Stadium) after the Chinese zodiac of that year.
 It is also the name of a place in the city. This year also marks the origin of the name of the Tokyo Kosha Company.

See also 

 Hwangap

References 

Sexagenary cycle
Pages with unreviewed translations